Zhangwan may refer to the following locations in China:

Zhangwan District (张湾区), Shiyan, Hubei
Zhangwan Subdistrict, Caidian (张湾街道), Caidian District, Wuhan, Hubei
Zhangwan Subdistrict, Xiangzhou (张湾街道), Xiangzhou District, Xiangyang, Hubei
Zhangwan, Ningde (漳湾镇), town in Jiaocheng District, Ningde, Fujian
Zhangwan, Dingtao County (张湾镇), town in Shandong
Zhangwan Township, Shan County, Henan (张湾乡)
Zhangwan Township, Donghai County (张湾乡), Jiangsu
Zhangwan Township, Kaihua County (张湾乡), Zhejiang
Zhangwan Village (张湾村), Mawan, Tianmen, Hubei